In mathematics, the Stolarsky mean is a generalization of the logarithmic mean. It was introduced by Kenneth B. Stolarsky in 1975.

Definition
For two positive real numbers x, y the Stolarsky Mean is defined as:

Derivation

The Stolarsky mean is obtained by

when choosing .

Special cases 

 is the minimum.
 is the geometric mean.
 is the logarithmic mean. It can be obtained from the mean value theorem by choosing .
 is the power mean with exponent .
 is the identric mean. It can be obtained from the mean value theorem by choosing .
 is the arithmetic mean.
 is a connection to the quadratic mean and the geometric mean.
 is the maximum.

Generalizations 

One can generalize the mean to n + 1 variables by considering the mean value theorem for divided differences for the nth derivative.
One obtains

See also 
Mean

References 

Means